Portland Cottage light structure formerly Portland Lighthouse sometimes Portland Point Lighthouse is situated on the summit of Portland Ridge, Clarendon, near the southernmost part of Jamaica.

It has a white revolving light, giving two flashes in quick succession every 15 seconds.

The lighthouse is maintained by the Port Authority of Jamaica, an agency of the Ministry of Transport and Works.

See also

 List of lighthouses in Jamaica

References

External links
 Wikimapia aerial view of Portland Lighthouse.
 Photos:  .

Lighthouses in Jamaica
Buildings and structures in Clarendon Parish, Jamaica